Neural precursor cell expressed developmentally downregulated gene 4-like (NEDD4L) or NEDD4-2 is an enzyme (ubiquitin ligase) of the NEDD4 family. 
In human the protein is encoded by the NEDD4L gene. In mouse the protein is commonly known as NEDD4-2 and the gene Nedd4-2.

NEDD4-2 has been shown to ubiquitinate and therefore down regulate the epithelial sodium channel (ENaC) in the collecting ducts of the kidneys, therefore opposing the actions of aldosterone and increasing salt excretion.  In Liddle's Syndrome NEDD4 is unable to bind to the ENaC and lead to salt retention and hypertension occur.

NEDD4L belongs to the NEDD4 family of E3 HECT domain ubiquitin ligases.  It is the closest homologue of NEDD4, the prototypic member of the family and probably arose as a result of gene duplication. While NEDD4 orthologues are present in all eukaryotes, NEDD4L proteins are limited to vertebrates. NEDD4L proteins are known to be involved in regulating many membrane proteins via ubiquitination and endocytosis.

NEDD4L protein is expressed widely. The primary targets of NEDD4-2 include the epithelial sodium channel (ENaC), the Na+-Cl- co-transporter (NCC), and the voltage gated sodium channels (Navs), although additional targets are predicted from in vitro studies. NEDD4-2 gene in mice is essential for animal survival and the polymorphisms in NEDD4L are associated with human hypertension.

Protein architecture
The NEDD4-2 protein consists of an amino-terminal Ca2+-phospholipid binding domain (C2), 4 WW domains (protein-protein interaction domains) and the carboxyl-terminal HECT domain (ubiquitin ligase domain). The WW domains in the protein are responsible for binding the substrates, regulatory proteins and adaptors. These domains generally recognize PPxY (or similar) motifs in the target proteins.

Expression
Human NEDD4L gene is located on chromosome 18q12.31 with 38 exons that transcribe multiple splice variants of NEDD4L. The protein expressed in the brain, lung, heart and the kidney contains a C2 domain. Three predominant forms of NEDD4L are isoform I containing a novel C2 domain with a start codon in exon1, isoform II with an intact conserved C2 domain consisting of an alternate start codon in exon 1 upstream of the actual start codon of the isoform 1, and isoform III lacking a C2 domain due to exon 2a–3 splicing.  Isoform 1 is found to be abundant in kidney and adrenal gland whereas isoform 2 is predominantly found in the lungs. The antibodies specific to NEDD4-2 recognize two species of ~110-115 kDa in most tissues, with one being variable depending on the tissue.

Function 
NEDD4L is a ubiquitin-protein ligase (E3) that accepts ubiquitin from an E2 ubiquitin-conjugating enzyme in the form of a thioester and then transfers it to specific substrates.

In vivo NEDD4-2 regulates ENaC in the lung and kidney, the renal NCC and several Navs. 
It has also been shown to regulate EGFR, TGFβ receptor and WNT signalling. 
NEDD4L has been implicated in viral budding and viral latency processes via ubiquitination of viral proteins. 
In vitro data implicate NEDD4-2 in the regulation of many other proteins, including several ion channels and transporters. However most of these results have not been validated in vivo.

Regulation of NEDD4-2
NDFIP1 and NDFIP2 proteins bind NEDD4-2 and regulate its activity and/or interaction with substrates. 
NEDD4-2 phosphorylation by kinases SGK1 and AKT in response to insulin and aldosterone signaling results in its interaction with 14-3-3 proteins. 14-3-3 binding to NEDD4-2 inhibits its ability to bind and ubiquitinate its substrates (such the ENaC subunits).  
Autoubiquitination and deubiquitylation of NEDD4-2 by USP2-45 are also known to maintain NEDD4-2 protein stability.

Clinical significance 
NEDD4L is a critical regulator of renal ENaC and NCC and malfunction of this pathway has been linked to hypertension, as in Liddle's syndrome, a genetic disorder where mutations in the ENaC subunits abrogate NEDD4L binding.
In mouse, NEDD4-2 deletion leads to increased cell surface expression and activity of ENaC in the lung, resulting in premature clearance of lung fluid, airway drying, lung inflammation and perinatal lethality.

Specific deletion of NEDD4-2 in mouse renal tubules leads to increased expression of ENaC and NCC. Consistent with the critical function in ENaC and NCC regulation, NEDDL polymorphisms are linked to essential hypertension in certain human populations. Specific deletion of NEDD4-2 in mouse neurons results in axonal branching defects. Isolated fetal cortical neurons from NEDD4-2 knockout mice show defective regulation of voltage-gated sodium currents, and in animal models of neuropathic pain NEDD4-2 expression has been found to be downregulated. Also NEDD4-2-deficiency results in hyperexcitability of DRG neurons and contributes to pathological pain

Interactions 

NEDD4L has been shown to interact with SCNN1A.

Notes

References

Further reading 

 
 
 
 
 
 
 
 
 
 
 
 
 
 
 
 

Human proteins